Jazuli may refer to:

Jazuli, the protagonist of the novel Tuan Direktur
 Muhammad Jazuli, birth name of KH Fakhruddin
Jazuli order of Sufism, after Muhammad al-Jazuli

See also
al-Jazuli